Anthropology in Action is a peer-reviewed academic journal published by Berghahn Books that covers anthropological subjects through commentaries, key articles, research reports, and book reviews. The editor-in-chief is Christine McCourt (City University London).

Abstracting and indexing 
Anthropology in Action is indexed and abstracted in:
 Anthropological Index
 Abstracts in Anthropology
 International Bibliography of Book Reviews of Scholarly Literature on the Humanities and Social Sciences
 International Bibliography of Periodicals
 MLA International Bibliography
 Scopus
 Sociological Abstracts

References

External links 
 

Anthropology journals
Triannual journals
Berghahn Books academic journals
English-language journals
Publications established in 2005